XHZTM-FM is a non-commercial radio station on 89.1 FM in Zitácuaro, Michoacán, Mexico, owned by Alfonso Ibarra Valdés. It is known as Fantasía W Radio.

History
XHZTM received its social use concession on February 15, 2016. It serves as a broadcast outlet for Fantasía Radio, which began operations as an internet radio station in 2010.

References

Radio stations in Michoacán